The list of ship launches in 1951 includes a chronological list of all ships launched in 1951.


References 

Sources

1951
Ship launches